Herbert Cheffers (26 November 1883 – 20 August 1973) was an Australian rules footballer who played with Collingwood in the Victorian Football League (VFL).

Notes

External links 

Herbert Cheffers's profile at Collingwood Forever

1883 births
1973 deaths
Australian rules footballers from Victoria (Australia)
Collingwood Football Club players
Australian rules footballers from Adelaide